Bankim Chandra Hazra is an Indian politician and the present Minister of Sundarban Affairs, Government of West Bengal in the Government of West Bengal. He is also an MLA, elected from the Namkhana constituency in the 2001 West Bengal state assembly election, In 2011 West Bengal state assembly election, In 2016 and 2021 assembly election he was re-elected from the same constituency.

References

External links
 

State cabinet ministers of West Bengal
Living people
Year of birth missing (living people)